Leclerc may refer to:

 E.Leclerc, a French hypermarket chain
 Leclerc (surname), a French surname
 Arthur Leclerc (born 2000), Monégasque racing driver
 Charles Leclerc (born 1997), Monégasque Formula One driver
 Charles Leclerc (general, born 1772) (1772–1802), French general and brother-in-law of Napoleon Bonaparte
 Marc-André Leclerc (1992–2018), Canadian rock climber
 Philippe Leclerc de Hauteclocque (1902–1947), a French general
 Leclerc tank, a main battle tank built by Nexter of France, named in honour of General Philippe Leclerc de Hauteclocque

See also

 
 
 Leclercq (surname)
 Clerc (surname)
 Clerck (surname)
 De Clerck (surname)
 Clerk (disambiguation)